Gross state product for the state of Idaho in 2015 was $64.9 billion, and the per capita income based on 2015 GDP and 2015 population estimates was $39,100.

Idaho is an important agricultural state, producing nearly one-third of the potatoes grown in the United States. All three varieties of wheat—dark northern spring, hard red, and soft white—are grown in the state.

Important industries in Idaho are food processing, lumber and wood products, machinery, chemical products, paper products, electronics manufacturing, silver and other mining, and tourism. The world's largest factory for barrel cheese, the raw product for processed cheese is in Gooding, Idaho. It has a capacity of 120,000 metric tons per year of barrel cheese and belongs to the Glanbia group. The Idaho National Laboratory (INL) is the largest Department of Energy facility in the country by area. INL is an important part of the eastern Idaho economy. Idaho also is home to three facilities of Anheuser-Busch which provide a large part of the malt for breweries across the nation.

A variety of industries are important. Outdoor recreation is a common example ranging from numerous snowmobile and downhill and cross-country ski areas in winter to the evolution of Lewiston as a retirement community based on mild winters, dry, year-round climate and one of the lowest median wind velocities anywhere, combined with the rivers for a wide variety of activities. Other examples would be ATK Corporation, which operates three ammunition and ammunition components plants in Lewiston. Two are sporting and one is defense contract. The Lewis-Clark valley has an additional independent ammunition components manufacturer and the Chipmunk rifle factory until it was purchased in 2007 by Keystone Sporting Arms and production was moved to Milton, Pennsylvania. Four of the world's six welded aluminum jet boat (for running river rapids) manufacturers are in the Lewiston-Clarkston, WA valley. Wine grapes were grown between Kendrick and Juliaetta in the Idaho Panhandle by the French Rothschilds until Prohibition. In keeping with this, while there are no large wineries or breweries in Idaho, there are numerous and growing numbers of award-winning boutique wineries and microbreweries in the northern part of the state.

Today, Idaho's largest industry is the science and technology sector. It accounts for over 25% of the state's revenue and over 70% of the state's exports. Idaho's industrial economy is growing, with high-tech products leading the way. Since the late 1970s, Boise has emerged as a center for semiconductor manufacturing. Boise is the home of Micron Technology, the only U.S. manufacturer of dynamic random-access memory (DRAM) chips. Micron at one time manufactured desktop computers, but with very limited success. Hewlett-Packard has operated a large plant in Boise since the 1970s, which is devoted primarily to LaserJet printers production. Boise-based Clearwater Analytics is another rapidly growing investment accounting and reporting software firm, reporting on over $1 trillion in assets. ON Semiconductor, whose worldwide headquarters is in Pocatello, is a widely recognized innovator of modern integrated mixed-signal semiconductor products, mixed-signal foundry services, and structured digital products. Coldwater Creek, a women's clothing retailer, is headquartered in Sandpoint. Sun Microsystems (now a part of Oracle Corporation) has two offices in Boise and a parts depot in Pocatello. Sun brings $4 million in annual salaries and over $300 million of revenue to the state each year.

A number of Fortune 500 companies started in or trace their roots to Idaho, including Safeway in American Falls, Albertsons in Boise, the J. R. Simplot Company across southern Idaho, and Potlatch Corp. in Lewiston. Zimmerly Air Transport in Lewiston-Clarkston was one of the five companies in the merger centered around Varney Air Lines of Pasco, Washington, which became United Airlines and subsequently Varney Air Group that became Continental Airlines.

The state personal income tax ranges from 1.6% to 7.8% in eight income brackets. Idahoans may apply for state tax credits for taxes paid to other states, as well as for donations to Idaho state educational entities and some nonprofit youth and rehabilitation facilities.

The state sales tax is 6% with a very limited, selective local option up to 6.5%. Sales tax applies to the sale, rental or lease of tangible personal property and some services. Food is taxed, but prescription drugs are not. Hotel, motel, and campground accommodations are taxed at a higher rate (7% to 11%). Some jurisdictions impose local option sales tax.

The sales tax was introduced at 3% in 1965, easily approved by voters, where it remained until 1983.

In 2014, Idaho emerged as the second most small business friendly state, ranking behind Utah, based on a study drawing upon data from over 12,000 small business owners.

Idaho has a state gambling lottery which contributed $333.5 million in payments to all Idaho public schools and Idaho higher education from 1990 to 2006.

Total employment 2016
562,282
Total employer establishments 
45,826

References